Selected Poems 1965–1975 is a poetry collection by Seamus Heaney, who received the 1995 Nobel Prize in Literature. It was published in 1980 by Faber and Faber (and published in the United States as Poems 1965–1975 by Farrar, Straus and Giroux, 1981). It includes selections from Heaney's first four volumes of verse:
Death of a Naturalist (1966)
Door into the Dark (1969)
Wintering Out (1972)
North (1975)

1980 poetry books
Irish poetry collections
Poetry by Seamus Heaney
Faber and Faber books